The ferrierite group of zeolite minerals (the FER structure) consists of three very similar species: ferrierite-Mg, ferrierite-Na, and ferrierite-K, based on the dominant cation in the A location. ferrierite-Mg and ferrierite-K are orthorhombic minerals and ferrierite-Na is monoclinic with highly variable cationic composition . Calcium and other ions are often also present. They are found in vitreous to pearly, often radiating, spherical aggregates of thin blade-shaped transparent to translucent crystals.

Ferrierite typically occurs as an alteration mineral in basaltic rocks and in tuffaceous sediments. In North America, it is found at Kamloops Lake, BC, Canada (the original type locality) and Leavitt Lake, California. Ferrierite was named for Canadian geologist and mining engineer Walter Frederick Ferrier (1865–1950).

Synthetic ferrierite
Synthetic ferrierites have even greater cation variability and have important uses as commercial filters and ion-exchange beds.

Ferrierite-H can be used as a catalyst in the chemical industry for the acid-catalyzed skeletal isomerization of n-butenes to isobutene, the raw material for production of methyl tert-butyl ether (MTBE).

The hydrophobic all-silica ferrierite (Si-FER) has very high selectivity in the separation of alcohol–water mixtures, due to the very restrictive shape and space constraints of the FER framework type. At high pressure, Si-FER can achieve the separation of an ethanol–water liquid mixture into supramolecular blocks of its components, namely, ethanol dimer wires and water tetramer squares.

See also
List of minerals
List of minerals named after people

References

External links
Structure type FER
Univ. Florida images

Sodium minerals
Potassium minerals
Aluminium minerals
Magnesium minerals
Zeolites
Orthorhombic minerals
Minerals in space group 71